Baranowo  is a village in Ostrołęka County, Masovian Voivodeship, in east-central Poland. It is the seat of the gmina (administrative district) called Gmina Baranowo.

The village has a population of 1,250.

References

Villages in Ostrołęka County
Warsaw Voivodeship (1919–1939)